The 2020 New Mexico House of Representatives elections took place on November 3, 2020 as part of the biennial United States elections. All the seats in the New Mexico House of Representatives were up for election. The previous election was held in 2018.

Primary elections were held on June 3, alongside the 2020 New Mexico Democratic presidential primary.

Summary of results

Closest races 
Seats where the margin of victory was under 10%:
  
 
   
  
  
  gain

Retiring incumbents
Eleven incumbent representatives (7 Democrats and 4 Republicans) did not seek reelection.

Abbas Akhil (D), District 20
Paul Bandy (R), District 3
Daniel R. Barrone (D), District 42
David Gallegos (R), District 61
Tim Lewis (R), District 60
Patricio Ruiloba (D), District 12 (sought reelection but was disqualified from the ballot; subsequently resigned on September 9, 2020)
Tomás Salazar (D), District 70
Joseph L. Sanchez (D), District 40
Gregg Schmedes (D), District 22
Jim Trujillo (D), District 45 (subsequently resigned on September 29, 2020)
Linda Trujillo (D), District 48 (subsequently resigned on July 9, 2020)

Defeated incumbents

In primary
No incumbent representative was defeated in the primary.

In general election
One incumbent (a Democrat) was defeated in the general election.

Art De La Cruz (D), District 12

Predictions

Detailed results

District 1

District 2

District 3

District 4

District 5

District 6

District 7

District 8

District 9

District 10

District 11
Republican primary

General election

District 12
Incumbent Democrat Patricio Ruiloba was disqualified from the primary ballot on March 31, 2020 for submitting incomplete information on his election paperwork. Subsequently, Ruiloba resigned effective September 9 in order to run for Bernalillo County Sheriff. Former Bernalillo County Commissioner Art De La Cruz was appointed to the vacant seat, but because the Democratic Party did not have a valid nominee to replace on the ballot, De La Cruz was forced to run for election to a full term as a write-in candidate.

District 13
Democratic primary

General election

District 14
Democratic primary

General election

District 15

District 16

District 17
Democratic primary

General election

District 18

District 19

District 20
Democratic primary

General election

District 21

District 22

District 23
Republican primary

General election

District 24

District 25

District 26

District 27
Incumbent Democrat Bill Pratt died on December 29, 2019. The Bernalillo County Commission appointed Marian Matthews to the vacant seat on January 9, 2020.
Democratic primary

Republican primary

General election

District 28

District 29

District 30

District 31

District 32

District 33

District 34
Democratic primary

General election

District 35

District 36

District 37

District 38

District 39

District 40
Democratic primary

General election

District 41

District 42
Democratic incumbent Roberto Gonzales was appointed to a vacant State Senate seat on December 20, 2019. Taos Mayor Daniel R. Barrone was appointed to succeed Gonzales on January 4, 2020. In April 2020, Barrone announced he would not seek a full term as Representative.
Democratic primary

Republican primary

General election

District 43

District 44

District 45
Democratic primary

General election

District 46

District 47

District 48
Incumbent Democrat Linda Trujillo resigned on July 9, 2020, after winning the Democratic primary unopposed. Democrat Tara Lujan was appointed to succeed Trujillo on July 23.

District 49

District 50
Democratic primary

General election

District 51

District 52

District 53

District 54

District 55

District 56

District 57

District 58

District 59

District 60

District 61
Republican primary

General election

District 62

District 63

District 64

District 65
Democratic primary

General election

District 66

District 67

District 68

District 69

District 70
Democratic primary

General election

See also
 2020 New Mexico elections

References

External links
 
 
  (State affiliate of the U.S. League of Women Voters)
 

House
New Mexico House of Representatives elections
New Mexico House